A dune is a hill of sand.

Dune or dunes may also refer to:

Places and buildings 
 Düne, Heligoland, Germany
 Dunes, Tarn-et-Garonne, France
 Dune (crater), on the Moon
 Dunes (hotel and casino), Paradise, Nevada, US
 Dunes Hotel and Casino (Atlantic City), US, unbuilt

Science fiction
Dune (franchise) of novels, films, and games:
 Dune (novel), a 1965 novel by Frank Herbert
 Arrakis or Dune, a fictional planet
 Dune (1984 film), a 1984 film directed by David Lynch
 Dune (soundtrack)
 Frank Herbert's Dune, a 2000 television miniseries
 Frank Herbert's Children of Dune, a 2003 television miniseries
 Dune (2021 film), a 2021 film directed by Denis Villeneuve
 Dune: Part Two, the upcoming sequel to Villeneuve's 2021 film
 Dune: The Sisterhood, an upcoming television series
 Dune (board game) (1979)
 Dune (1984 board game), see List of games based on Dune
 Dune (Virgin Interactive / Westwood Studios) video game series, see List of games based on Dune
 Dune (video game) (1992)
 Frank Herbert's Dune (video game) (2001)
 Dune (card game) (1997)
 Jodorowsky's Dune, documentary about an attempted film

Music

Bands and musicians
 Dune (band), a German progressive trance/hardcore group
 Dúné, a Danish rock band
 Brothomstates or Dune, Finnish IDM musician

Albums
 Dune (Dune album) (1995)
 Dune (Klaus Schulze album) (1979)
 Dune (L'Arc-en-Ciel album) (1993)
 Dunes (album), an album by Garden & Villa
 Dune by David Matthews (1977)

Songs
 "Dune", a song by Susumu Hirasawa from Water in Time and Space
 "Dune", a song by Zion I from Deep Water Slang V2.0
 "Dunes", a 1975 tune by Keith Jarrett from Arbour Zena
 "Dunes", a song by Scale the Summit from Carving Desert Canyons
 "Dunes", a song by the Alabama Shakes

People
 Chris "Dune" Pastras (b. 1972) - American skateboarder, artist, and company owner

Other uses 
 Deep Underground Neutrino Experiment (DUNE)
 Dune (software), for solving partial differential equations using grid-based methods
 Dunes (stamps), a series of (now worthless) collector's editions of stamps from the Trucial States (now the United Arab Emirates)
 Dune London, a British shoe manufacturer and retailer

See also 
 Dune Shearwater, an extinct seabird species from the Canary Islands
 Dyuny railway station, a railway station near Sestroretsk, St. Petersburg, Russia